José Carlos Alves Ferreira Pinto (born 2 March 1973) is a Portuguese former footballer who played as a midfielder, currently a manager.

Playing career
Born in Paços de Ferreira, Pinto began his senior career at Rebordosa A.C. of the third division in 1991. A year later, he returned to his parent club F.C. Paços de Ferreira, making one substitute appearance in each of his two Primeira Liga seasons.

Besides four matches – one start – for S.C. Salgueiros in the top tier in the 1998–99 campaign, Pinto spent most of his career in the lower leagues, representing Associação Naval 1º de Maio, C.D. Feirense and G.D. Chaves in the Segunda Liga over six seasons (21 as a senior overall).

Coaching career
Pinto's first managerial job was at F.C. Tirsense in the third level in 2012. He then worked with several teams in the second tier.

On 1 July 2016, Pinto was appointed at his hometown club Paços de Ferreira. He resigned on 28 November with the team in 15th, two points above the relegation zone, and eliminated from the Taça de Portugal by lowly U.D. Vilafranquense.

Pinto returned to his former employer C.D. Santa Clara on 8 December 2016, as their fourth manager of the season. He left the Azorean side on 14 May 2018 at the end of his contract, having won promotion to the top flight in second place.

Pinto remained in the second division, at Associação Académica de Coimbra, whom he left on 1 October 2018 by mutual consent after being ousted from the Portuguese Cup by amateurs Juventude de Pedras Salgadas. The following 18 March he was appointed at F.C. Famalicão of the same league, and he won seven of their last eight games to earn promotion.

On 24 May 2019, it was confirmed that Pinto would take charge of second-tier Leixões S.C. for the upcoming campaign. He resigned the following 18 January, after a run of eight matches without a win left the team in ninth place.

Pinto returned to Chaves in May 2020. He left by mutual consent the following 8 February, with the side placed fifth in the second division.

On 10 July 2022, Pinto was appointed at Saudi First Division League club Al-Jabalain FC. He was dismissed on 20 October due to poor results.

Honours

Manager
Freamunde
Campeonato de Portugal: 2013–14

References

External links

1973 births
Living people
People from Paços de Ferreira
Sportspeople from Porto District
Portuguese footballers
Association football midfielders
Primeira Liga players
Liga Portugal 2 players
Segunda Divisão players
F.C. Paços de Ferreira players
Rebordosa A.C. players
A.D. Lousada players
U.S.C. Paredes players
S.C. Salgueiros players
Associação Naval 1º de Maio players
C.D. Feirense players
G.D. Chaves players
F.C. Vizela players
F.C. Tirsense players
Portuguese football managers
Primeira Liga managers
Liga Portugal 2 managers
S.C. Freamunde managers
C.D. Tondela managers
G.D. Chaves managers
C.D. Santa Clara managers
F.C. Paços de Ferreira managers
Associação Académica de Coimbra – O.A.F. managers
F.C. Famalicão managers
Leixões S.C. managers
Saudi First Division League managers
Portuguese expatriate football managers
Expatriate football managers in Saudi Arabia
Portuguese expatriate sportspeople in Saudi Arabia